Hochevar is a surname. Notable people with the surname include:

 Brittany Hochevar (born 1981), American volleyball player
 Luke Hochevar (born 1983), American baseball pitcher